The 1992 Cork Senior Football Championship was the 104th staging of the Cork Senior Football Championship since its establishment by the Cork County Board in 1887. The draw for the opening fixtures took place on 15 December 1991. The championship began on 2 May 1992 and ended on 13 September 1992.

Duhallow entered the championship as the defending champions, however, they were defeated by O'Donovan Rossa in the second round.

On 13 September 1992, O'Donovan Rossa won the championship following a 2-09 to 0-10 defeat of Nemo Rangers in the final. It remains their only championship title.

O'Donovan Rossa's Mick McCarthy was the championship's top scorer with 3-26.

Team changes

To Championship

Promoted from the Cork Intermediate Football Championship
 Aghada

Results

First round

Second round

Quarter-final

Semi-finals

Final

Championship statistics

Top scorers

Overall

In a single game

Miscellaneous

 O'Donovan Rossa qualify for the final for the first time.
 O'Donovan Rossa win their first senior title.

References

Cork Senior Football Championship